Eupithecia amphiplex is a moth in the  family Geometridae. It is found in the Democratic Republic of Congo and Kenya.

References

Moths described in 1932
amphiplex
Moths of Africa